Versant are computerized tests of spoken language. 

Versant may also refer to:

 Versant (band)
 Versant Corporation, software company
 Versant District, a municipal district in Gatineau, Quebec, Canada